Co-benefits of climate change mitigation are the benefits related to mitigation measures which reduce greenhouse gas emissions or enhance carbon sinks. 

From an economic perspective, co-benefits can enhance increased employment through carbon tax revenues and the implementation of renewable energy. A higher share of renewables can additionally lead to more energy security. Socioeconomic co-benefits have been analysed such as energy access in rural areas and improved rural livelihoods.  

Apart from climate protection, mitigation policies can foster additional ecological co-benefits but also risks with regards to soil conservation, fertility, biodiversity and wildlife habitat. Further, mitigation policies bear opportunities for capacity building, participation and forest governance for local communities.

Definition 
In general, the term co-benefits refers to "simultaneously meeting several interests or objectives resulting from a political intervention, private sector investment or a mix thereof". Opportunistic co-benefits appear as auxiliary or side effect while focusing on a central objective or interest. Strategic co-benefits result from a deliberate effort to seizing several opportunities (e.g., economic, business, social, environmental) with a single purposeful intervention."

Co-benefits, also often referred to as ancillary benefits, have been addressed in scientific literature and were firstly dominated by studies that describe how lower GHG emissions lead to better air quality and consequently impact human health positively. The scope of co-benefits research expanded to its economic, social, ecological and political implications.

Main co-benefits for people

Clean air 
Climate change mitigation policies can lead to lower emissions of co-emitted air pollutants, for instance by shifting away from fossil fuel combustion. In addition, gases such as black carbon and methane contribute both to global warming and to air pollution, such that their mitigation can bring benefits in terms of limiting global temperature increases as well as improving air quality. Implementation of the climate pledges made in the run-up to the Paris Agreement could therefore have significant benefits for human health by improving air quality. The replacement of coal-based energy with renewables can lower the number of premature deaths caused by air pollution. A higher share of renewable energy and consequently less coal-related respiratory diseases can decrease health costs.

Active lifestyle 

Biking reduces greenhouse gas emissions while reducing the effects of a sedentary lifestyle at the same time According to PLoS Medicine: "obesity, diabetes, heart disease, and cancer, which are in part related to physical inactivity, may be reduced by a switch to low-carbon transport—including walking and cycling."

Health

Climate change adaptation

Employment and economic development 
Co-benefits can positively impact employment, industrial development, states' energy independence and energy self-consumption. The deployment of renewable energies can foster job opportunities. Depending on the country and deployment scenario, replacing coal power plants with renewable energy can more than double the number of jobs per average MW capacity. Investments in renewable energies, especially in solar- and wind energy, can boost the value of production. Countries which rely on energy imports can enhance their energy independence and ensure supply security by deploying renewables. National energy generation from renewables lowers the demand for fossil fuel imports which scales up annual economic saving. Households and businesses can additionally benefit from investments in renewable energy. The deployment of rooftop solar and PV-self-consumption creates incentives for low-income households and can support annual savings for the residential sector.

Energy access 
Positive secondary effects from mitigation strategies can also occur for energy access. Rural areas which are not fully electrified can benefit from the deployment of renewable energies. Solar-powered mini-grids can remain economically viable, cost-competitive and reduce the number of power cuts. Energy reliability has additional social implications: stable electricity improves the quality of education.

History 
Positive secondary effects that occur from climate mitigation and adaptation measures have been mentioned in research since the 1990s. 

The IPCC pointed out in 2007: "Co-benefits of GHG mitigation can be an important decision criteria in analyses carried out by policy-makers, but they are often neglected." And often the co-benefits are "not quantified, monetised or even identified by businesses and decision-makers". Appropriate consideration of co-benefits can greatly "influence policy decisions concerning the timing and level of mitigation action", and there can be "significant advantages to the national economy and technical innovation". 

The IPCC first mentioned the role of co-benefits in 2001, followed by its fourth and fifth assessment cycle stressing improved working environment, reduced waste, health benefits and reduced capital expenditures. In the early 2000s the OECD was further fostering its efforts in promoting ancillary benefits. During the past decade, co-benefits have been discussed by several other international organisations: The International Energy Agency (IEA) spelled out the "multiple benefits approach" of energy efficiency while the International Renewable Energy Agency (IRENA) operationalised the list of co-benefits of the renewable energy sector.

Relevance for international agreements 
The UNFCCC's Paris Agreement acknowledges mitigation co-benefits from Parties' action plans. Co-benefits have been integrated in official national policy documents such as India's National Action Plan on Climate Change or the updated Vietnamese National Determined Contributions.

Risks

References

Emissions reduction
Environmental social science concepts
Human impact on the environment
Climate change mitigation